Pfaffenthal-Kirchberg railway station is a rail station on CFL Line 10, in the north of Luxembourg City which opened in December 2017. It is located on Rue Saint-Mathieu in the Pfaffenthal valley, below the Grand Duchess Charlotte Bridge, overlooking the Alzette River. The Société Nationale des Chemins de Fer Luxembourgeois (CFL), the state-owned rail company, operates both it and the accompanying funicular line, which links the station to tram services on the Kirchberg plateau.

History
The plans for the station and the associated funicular, and tram projects were presented in September 2011 as part of the Luxembourg government's wider sustainable mobility strategy. The aim is to reduce travel time for cross border and domestic rail commuters to the Kirchberg quarter of Luxembourg City, the location of many European Union (EU) institutions, including the Court of Justice of the European Union, and a growing commercial sector. Prior to completion, rail commuters to the Kirchberg plateau would have to alight at the central Luxembourg station and make a further commute across the city.
The pre-construction analysis took place between 2013 and 2014, with construction works spanning from March 2015, to late 2017. The station and the accompanying funicular line is estimated, at the time of construction, to have cost 96 million euros.

Passenger information

Accessibility
Step-free access is available throughout the station. Elevators and escalators connect both platforms to the enclosed footbridge for interchanges, with further elevators providing access from the Rue St Mathieu entrance to platform 2 and the footbridge, and the funicular above platform 1 providing access from Avenue J.F. Kennedy to the station.
Due to the decision not to charge passengers for use of the funicular, the funicular, via the station provides a step-free access route for pedestrians and cyclists from the Kirchberg plateau to the Pfaffenthal valley below.

Services
Pfaffenthal-Kirchberg station is served by trains from the InterCity (IC), Regional-Express (RE) and Regionalbahn (RB) services.

 Line 10 : Luxembourg - Ettelbruck - Diekirch - Troisvierges - Gouvy (- Liers - Liège-Guillemins for IC services);
 Line 10-60: Rodange - Luxembourg - Troisvierges;
 Line 70-10 : Longwy - Luxembourg - Mersch.

The station is currently served by four trains per hour, which will increase to 6 in 2020 following the expected completion of works to extend Luxembourg railway station and to allow increased traffic at Dommeldange station.

Other transport services and connections
The station is served by the Pfaffenthal-Kirchberg funicular which makes the steep ascent to the end of the main thoroughfare on the Kirchberg quarter, Avenue John F. Kennedy, allowing for use of the connecting tramstop at the Grand Duchess Charlotte Bridge. In addition, a range of bus services are available from the Kirchberg funicular station, including the municipal AVL lines 1, 7, 8, 16, 18 and 20 and regional bus lines 120, 125, 130, 142, 144, 165, 172, 192, 194, 195, 213, 222, 262, 282 and 740. In addition, the Rue St Mathieu entrance to the station in the Pffafenthal valley is served by the AVL 23 bus.

Located a short walk from the station's Rue St Mathieu entrance, across the Alzette river, on the opposite side of the valley is the Pfaffenthal Panoramic Elevator, a public elevator providing a connection to the Pescatore Foundation Park in Ville Haute.

The Pffafenthal entrance to the station includes 44 cycle parking spaces and 56 secure paid cycle parking spaces, whilst the Kirchberg entrance has capacity for 53 cycle parking spaces, and 56 secure paid cycle parking spaces.

See also
History of rail transport in Luxembourg
Luxembourg railway network
Trams in Luxembourg
Pfaffenthal-Kirchberg funicular
 Pfaffenthal Panoramic Elevator

References 

Railway stations in Luxembourg City
Railway stations on CFL Line 10
Railway stations opened in 2017